Sphaerophoria fatarum is a European species of hoverfly.

Description
External images
Determination requires examination of the male genitalia which are figured by Haarto and Kerppola.

Distribution
Palearctic Scandinavia South to Belgium and France (Alps). Ireland eastwards through Central Europe to Switzerland and northern Italy.

References

Diptera of Europe
Syrphini
Insects described in 1989